Django and Sartana Are Coming... It's the End is a 1970 Spaghetti Western "directed by Demofilo Fidani and/or Diego Spataro".

The original Italian title of the film was Arrivano Django e Sartana... è la fine.

Plot
A pack of outlaws led by Black Burt Keller kidnap Jessica Colby and flee to Mexico. Bounty hunter Django and gunslinger Sartana join forces to rescue her.

References

External links

1970 films
Django films
Spaghetti Western films
Films scored by Lallo Gori
1970s Italian-language films
1970s Italian films